Tracey Wigfield (born June 19, 1983) is an American comedy writer. She created, produced and appeared in the NBC sitcom Great News. She also developed the Peacock teen sitcom Saved By The Bell, a revival of the original series of the same name created by Sam Bobrick.

Early life
Raised in Wayne, New Jersey, Wigfield attended Catholic schools throughout grade school. As a child, she was involved in both acting and dance.

She graduated in 2001 from the all-girls Immaculate Heart Academy in Washington Township, Bergen County, New Jersey. In high school, she used her parents' video camera to record comedy skits together with a friend.

Wigfield graduated from Boston College in 2005, where she majored in theater and English.

Career
After graduating, Wigfield moved back home and took an internship at CNN, then transferred to the page program at Late Show with David Letterman. She was then a production assistant on the short-lived television sitcom Knights of Prosperity.

Wigfield was hired as a writers' assistant on 30 Rock during the show's second season. She moved up to staff writer and then producer. From other writers, she was referred to the Upright Citizens Brigade theatre where she began performing and writing.

Wigfield and Tina Fey did much of the writing for the series finale of 30 Rock and the two went on to win the Primetime Emmy Award for Outstanding Writing for a Comedy Series for the episode, which aired on January 31, 2013.

After 30 Rock ended, Jack Burditt brought her to California to write for The Mindy Project, for which she and Mindy Kaling were co-executive producers. She appeared on the show as Dr. Lauren Neustadter. Wigfield created the NBC sitcom Great News, her first pilot, of which Fey is an executive producer. The series follows a producer at a news station whose mother begins an internship at the company.

Personal life 
Wigfield was raised Roman Catholic and today describes herself as a "Sorta Catholic." In a 2017 America magazine piece, she described being Catholic as "not a huge part of my deal... I practice what I call “Chipotle Catholicism”: I go down the line picking and choosing the parts of Catholicism that appeal to me (charity, Pope Frank, spooky stories about saints) in order to create a custom-made spiritual burrito."

Wigfield married comedy writer Adam Countee on May 21, 2016 in Manhattan. They have a daughter named Celine, born December 29, 2017, and a daughter named Beatrice, born February 28, 2020.

Filmography

References

External links
 

1983 births
20th-century American people
20th-century Roman Catholics
21st-century American women writers
21st-century Roman Catholics
American comedy writers
Immaculate Heart Academy alumni
American women television producers
American television writers
Morrissey College of Arts & Sciences alumni
Living people
People from Wayne, New Jersey
Primetime Emmy Award winners
American women television writers
Catholics from New Jersey
Screenwriters from New Jersey
21st-century American screenwriters
Television producers from New Jersey
20th-century American women